The  Palace of Culture Energetik  is an abandoned palace of culture located in the town of Pripyat, at the Chernobyl Exclusion Zone in Ukraine.

History
The Palace of Culture Energetik was built during the 1970s for the citizens of the town of Pripyat. The name “Energetik” is a play on words, as it means both “energetic” (lively) and “power plant worker”. 

Palaces of Culture were large community centers established during the Soviet era with over 137,000 in the Soviet Union by 1988. These generally physically impressive buildings were designed as a focal point for people to enjoy a range of recreational and artistic activities all under the banner, quite literally in many cases, of political propaganda. Pripyat’s Palace of Culture includes what’s left of a cinema, theatre, library, gymnasium, swimming pool, boxing/wrestling ring, dancing and meeting halls and even has a shooting range in the basement.

After the Chernobyl Disaster in 1986, the majority of the inhabitants of Pripyat were evacuated and the buildings were abandoned. Currently, the Palace of Culture is in a dilapidated condition.

The Ukrainian writer Lyubov Sirota worked briefly in the Palace of Culture.

Gallery

References

External links

Buildings and structures in Pripyat
Chernobyl Exclusion Zone
1970s establishments in Ukraine
Buildings and structures completed in the 20th century